Brasiliopuntia is a genus in the cactus family, Cactaceae. It contains only one species, Brasiliopuntia brasiliensis.

It is found in Brazil, Paraguay, eastern Bolivia, Peru and northern Argentina, and has become naturalized in Florida among other places.

Description 
Brasiliopuntia brasiliensis shows thin, slightly shrunken cladodes on a central cylindrical trunk. The leaves are bright green. Its white areoles bear one or two small brown upright spines. Its light brown flowers appear only on adult plants. This tree-cactus can grow as high as fortynine feet ( fifteen meters); the tallest member of the Opuntia subfamily.

Systematics 
Brasiliopuntia brasiliensis was placed in the genus Opuntia when the very broad genus Cactus was dismembered. The distinctive features of the species were recognized by Karl Schumann in 1898 when he created a subgenus Brasiliopuntia within the genus Opuntia. In 1926 Alwin Berger completed the separation from Opuntia by raising Brasiliopuntia to a full genus. A number of species have been described in the past, but are now considered only to be variants of B. brasiliensis.

Species list 
 Brasiliopuntia brasiliensis (Willdenow) A. Berger

Synonyms:
 Cactus brasiliensis Willdenow
 Opuntia brasiliensis (Willdenow) Haworth
 Opuntia bahiensis Britton & Rose
 Brasilopuntia bahiensis (Britton & Rose) A. Berger
 Opuntia schulzii A. Castellanos & Lelong
 Brasilopuntia neoargentina Backeberg
 Brasilopuntia schulzii (A. Castellanos & Lelong) Backeberg
 Brasilopuntia subcarpa Rizzini & A. Mattos

References

Bibliography
 Innes C, Wall B (1995).  Cacti Succulents and Bromaliads.  Cassell & The Royal Horticultural Society.

External links
  photos on www.cactiguide.com

Cacti of South America
Flora of Brazil
Flora of Argentina
Flora of Bolivia
Flora of Peru
Monotypic Cactaceae genera
Opuntioideae genera
Opuntioideae
Taxa named by Alwin Berger